Potiguara is an extinct Tupi language formerly used by the Potiguara people of Brazil.

Vocabulary
Potiguára words collected from an elderly male rememberer living in São Francisco, Pernambuco by Paul Wagner in 1961:

References

Tupi–Guarani languages